Asel Hagerty (or Asa Hagarty) (June 30, 1837 – March 30, 1919) was an American soldier who fought in the American Civil War. Hagerty received his country's highest award for bravery during combat, the Medal of Honor. Hagerty's medal was won for his capturing a flag at the Battle of Sayler's Creek, Virginia on April 6, 1865. He was honored with the award on May 10, 1865.

Hagerty was born in Canada. He joined the Army from Watertown, New York in August 1864, and mustered out with his regiment in July 1865. Hagerty was buried in Defiance, Ohio.

Medal of Honor citation

See also
List of American Civil War Medal of Honor recipients: G–L

Notes

References
*

External links

1837 births
1919 deaths
American Civil War recipients of the Medal of Honor
Burials in Ohio
Canadian-born Medal of Honor recipients
Pre-Confederation Canadian emigrants to the United States
People of New York (state) in the American Civil War
People from Defiance, Ohio
Military personnel from New York City
Union Army soldiers
United States Army Medal of Honor recipients